This was the first edition of the tournament.

Thomas Fabbiano won the title after defeating Matteo Berrettini 7–6(7–5), 7–6(9–7) in the final.

Seeds

Draw

Finals

Top half

Bottom half

References
Main Draw
Qualifying Draw

International Challenger Quanzhou - Singles